This is the List of Myanmar Motion Picture Academy Awards since 1952.

1952 Academy Awards

1953 Academy Awards

1954 Academy Awards

1955 Academy Awards

1956 Academy Awards

1957 Academy Awards

1958 Academy Awards

1959 Academy Awards

1960 Academy Awards

1961 Academy Awards

1962 Academy Awards

1964 Academy Awards

1965 Academy Awards

1966 Academy Awards

1967 Academy Awards

1968 Academy Awards

1969 Academy Awards

1970 Academy Awards

1971 Academy Awards

1972 Academy Awards

1973 Academy Awards

1974 Academy Awards

1975 Academy Awards

1976 Academy Awards

1977 Academy Awards

1978 Academy Awards

1979 Academy Awards

1980 Academy Awards

1981 Academy Awards

1982 Academy Awards

1983 Academy Awards

1984 Academy Awards

1985 Academy Awards

1986 Academy Awards

1987 Academy Awards

1988 Academy Awards

1989 Academy Awards

1990 Academy Awards

1991 Academy Awards

1992 Academy Awards

1993 Academy Awards

1994 Academy Awards

1995 Academy Awards

1996 Academy Awards

1997 Academy Awards

1998 Academy Awards

1999 Academy Awards

2000 Academy Awards

2001 Academy Awards

2002 Academy Awards

|-
| Best Sound
| Phoe Htaung and Group
|  (Upstream)
|-
| Best Editing
| Zaw Min (Han Thar Myay)
|  (Me, Another, Men, Women)
|}

2003 Academy Awards

2004 Academy Awards

2005 Academy Awards
The Myanmar Motion Picture Academy Awards presentation ceremony for 2005 was held for the first time in Naypyidaw on 5 March 2007. The awards were selected out of 16 films screened during the year of 2005.

2006 Academy Awards
The Myanmar Motion Picture Academy Awards presentation ceremony for 2006 was held in Naypyidaw on 7 February 2008. The awards were selected out of 10 films screened during the year of 2006.

2007 Academy Awards

2008 Academy Awards
The Myanmar Motion Picture Academy Awards presentation ceremony for 2008 was held on 6 February 2010 in Naypyidaw. The awards were selected out of 12 films screened in 2008.

2009 Academy Awards
The Myanmar Motion Picture Academy Awards presentation ceremony for 2009 was held on 23 January 2011 in Naypyidaw. The awards were selected out of 16 films screened in 2009.

2010 Academy Awards
The Myanmar Motion Picture Academy Awards presentation ceremony for 2010 was held on 7 February 2012 in Naypyidaw.

2011 Academy Awards
The Myanmar Motion Picture Academy Awards presentation ceremony for 2011 was held on 30 December 2012 in Yangon, after four years in the new capital Naypyidaw. The awards were selected out of 15 films screened in 2011. 8 of the top awards went to a single movie, Htar WaYa A Linn Tan Myar (Eternal Rays of Light).

2012 Academy Awards
The Myanmar Motion Picture Academy Awards presentation ceremony for 2012 was held on 29 December 2013 in Yangon.

2013 Academy Awards
The Myanmar Motion Picture Academy Awards presentation ceremony for 2013 was held on 27 December 2014 in Yangon.

2014 Academy Awards 
The Myanmar Motion Picture Academy Awards presentation ceremony for 2014 and 2015 was held on 3 April 2016 in Yangon, Myanmar Event Park. Kaung Kyoe Ko Hnite Ti Say Min won five golden angel trophy for Best Film, Best Screenplay, Best Actress, Best Music and Best Editing.

2015 Academy Awards

2016 Academy Awards 
The Myanmar Motion Picture Academy Awards for 2016 was held on 18 March 2017 at People's Square and Park, Yangon. This ceremony is distinct for the beautiful stage background with Shwedagon Pagoda. For the pre-celebration of 100-year Anniversary of Myanmar Motion Picture, decorated with 100 statutes of Academy awards. The VP and the Information Minister attended as VVIP Guest. Oak-Kyer-Myat-Pouk won three golden angel trophy for Best Film, Best Director and Best Actor.

2017 Academy Awards 
The Myanmar Motion Picture Academy Awards for 2017 was held on 23 March 2018 at Myanmar Event Park, Yangon.

2018 Academy Awards 
The Myanmar Motion Picture Academy Awards for 2018 was held on 23 March 2019 at The One Entertainment Park, Yangon.

References

External links
 

Myanmar Motion Picture Academy Awards